The 1938 Arizona State Bulldogs football team was an American football team that represented Arizona State Teachers College (later renamed Arizona State University) in the Border Conference during the 1938 college football season. In their first season under head coach Dixie Howell, the Bulldogs compiled a 3–6 record (0–4 against Border opponents) and were outscored by their opponents by a combined total of 98 to 89. Arizona State's team captain was center Wes Hastings.  The Bulldogs finished 2–2 at home and 1–4 on the road.  Earl Pomeroy and Hilman Walker were assistant coaches.  All home games were played at Goodwin Stadium in Tempe, Arizona.

Schedule

Game summaries
In the season opener, Arizona State Teacher's College lost an 18–7 road game against San Jose State.  The Bulldogs were shutout 21–0 in a road loss at New Mexico.  Arizona State  with a 13–0 victory over Cal Poly in their home opener.  The Bulldogs suffered a 19–13 loss to NAU on the road.  Despite a 99-yard touchdown run from Wayne Pitts, Arizona State dropped a 14–12 road game at New Mexico State.  The Bulldogs responded with a 10–0 home shutout win against California-Santa Barbara.  During their home finale, Arizona State fell, 12–7, to Hardin-Simmons.  The Bulldogs dropped a 14–6 contest to Texas-El Paso on the road.  Arizona State closed out its season with a 21–0 shutout road victory over Whittier.

Roster

The usual Arizona State lineup included left end Sam Andrews, left tackle Mark Kalastro, left guard Noble Riggs, center Wes Hastings, right guard Albert Sanserino, right tackle Henry Rockwell, right end Glenn Landreth, quarterback Ross Relles, halfbacks Hascall Henshaw and Bill Davis, and fullback Rex Hopper.

Wiley Aiker, Ted Anderson, Hilbert Brady, and Frank Consentino were also on roster.

References

Arizona State
Arizona State Sun Devils football seasons
Arizona State Sun Devils football